Richard Møller Nielsen (19 August 1937 – 13 February 2014) was a Danish football player and manager. He coached the Denmark national football team that won the UEFA Euro 1992 tournament. In 1995, he was awarded a gold version of the Medal of Merit. He was the father of Tommy Møller Nielsen.

Career
Nielsen was mostly known for his career as a football coach, but he played for Odense BK, and was capped twice for Denmark as a defender. An injury ended his career.

Nielsen coached, among others, Esbjerg fB, Odense BK and the Danish national youth team under head coach Sepp Piontek. In 1990 Piontek left his position as national coach, and replacement was required.  Nielsen was mentioned early in the race for the job, but the Danish Football Association decided to look abroad for a new coach. They selected German Horst Wohlers as the new Danish coach, but he was unable to cancel his contract with German club Bayer Uerdingen, so Nielsen was appointed.

European Champions
The first aim for Nielsen was to qualify for the Euro 1992 in Sweden. Denmark started out with a secure home victory against the Faroe Islands, followed by an away draw against Northern Ireland and a 2–0 home loss against Yugoslavia. Several players left the squad including Michael Laudrup, Brian Laudrup and Jan Heintze, and several newspapers were demanding that Richard Møller Nielsen step down. Despite the criticism, the team won the rest of their games in the group, including a 2–1 away win against Yugoslavia. It was, however, not enough to qualify. The Danish team finished second in the group just behind Yugoslavia.

However, UEFA banned Yugoslavia from participating in the championship as a result of the Yugoslav wars, and Denmark was chosen as the replacement because of the team had finished behind Yugoslavia in the qualification group.  The Danish team started out with a 0–0 against England and a defeat against hosts Sweden. A 2–1 win against France ensured Denmark a place in the semifinals. The defending European champions, The Netherlands, were the next opponent.  The match finished 2–2 in regular  time and with a 5–4 win in the penalty shoot-out, Denmark secured a place in the final against reigning world champions Germany. Denmark won the final 2–0, becoming the highlight of Nielsen's coaching career; he went on to win the "World Manager of the Year" awarded by World Soccer.

Confederations Cup winners

Denmark started the World Cup qualification for the 1994 FIFA World Cup with three 0–0 draws, before winning 1–0 against Northern Ireland in Belfast. On the 25 August 1993, Michael Laudrup made a comeback in a 4–0 victory home against Lithuania after having reconciled with Nielsen. The comeback of Denmark's most renowned player at the time was not enough to secure a qualification.  Laudrup never achieved the same success under Nielsen as he had enjoyed during the 1980s with Piontek as coach and Preben Elkjær next to him in the attack. The last game of the qualification was away against Spain in Seville, and the home team won 1–0, even though the Danes had been playing 11 against 10 for most of the game.

Nielsen could, however, again secure a trophy for Denmark when they participated in the Confederations Cup in 1995. This time the Danish team beat Argentina 2–0 in the final.  Nielsen had several players from the national Danish league in his squad, with players like Peter Schmeichel missing due to obligations with Manchester United.

The Danish team qualified for the Euro 1996 tournament in England, but the team failed to retain the title. Denmark was knocked out in the group stage, where the team finished third behind Croatia and Portugal. The team drew with Portugal, lost to Croatia and won against Turkey in the last game.  Nielsen left his position after the championship but is still considered the most successful coach of Denmark.

Finland and Israel

Nielsen went on to coach the Finland national football team and came close at securing a play-off game for the 1998 World Cup in France.  The Finnish team also failed to qualify for the Euro 2000 in Belgium and The Netherlands.

In 2000, Nielsen took over as coach of the Israeli national team, but Israel did not succeed in securing a place at the 2002 World Cup. It was Nielsen's last international job.  He went on to manage the Danish second division team Kolding FC before retiring in October 2003.

Odense BK has renamed one of the stands at Odense Stadion to Richard Møller Nielsen Tribunen. Furthermore, the city of Odense has named a square outside the stadium after the city's legendary coach.

Death
Nielsen died on 13 February 2014, following the unsuccessful removal of a brain tumour in September 2013. He was survived by his wife, three children and six grandchildren.

Managerial statistics

Managerial Honours

Club
Odense BK
Danish Football Championship 1977, 1982
Danish Cup 1983

International
Denmark
UEFA European Championship 1992
FIFA Confederations Cup 1995

Individual
World Soccer Manager of the Year 1992
European Coach of the Year—Sepp Herberger Award: 1992

References

External links

Danish national coach profile
Danish national player profile
Order of the Dannebrog

1937 births
2014 deaths
Footballers from Odense
Danish men's footballers
Denmark international footballers
Danish football managers
Odense Boldklub players
Odense Boldklub managers
Esbjerg fB managers
Denmark national football team managers
Finland national football team managers
Israel national football team managers
UEFA Euro 1992 managers
1995 King Fahd Cup managers
UEFA Euro 1996 managers
UEFA European Championship-winning managers
FIFA Confederations Cup-winning managers
Expatriate football managers in Israel
Danish expatriate football managers
Expatriate football managers in Finland
Association football defenders
Boldklubben 1909 managers
Danish expatriate sportspeople in Finland
Danish expatriate sportspeople in Israel